The Abzakh (Circassian: Абдзэх, Abdzekh; Russian: абадзехи; also known as Abdzakhs or Abadzekhs) are one of the twelve major Circassian tribes, representing one of the twelve stars on the green-and-gold Circassian flag. Historically, they lived in the mountainous part of the modern Russian republics of Adygea and Krasnodar Krai. Major settlements or villages were located in the river valleys Kurdzhips, Psheha, Pshish, and Psekups. 

However, today the vast majority of them live in diaspora in Turkey — about 500,000 people, which are the descendants of those expelled from their homeland as a result of the Russian–Circassian War. After Kabardians, the Abzakh are the second-largest Adyghe tribe in Turkey, other diaspora countries, and in the world in general. They are also the second-largest Adyghe tribe in Israel (after Shapsugs), largest in Jordan, and the sixth-largest in Russia. The Abzakhs are not to be confused with the Abkhazians or the Abaza, yet the naming "abadz'ekh" in Circassian language means "the people who live under the Abazas", but they are different in language.

History

Before the Caucasian War, Abzakhs inhabited the northern slope of the Caucasus mountain range, near the land of the Shapsug tribe.  After the Caucasian war, most Abzakhs (and other tribes) were deported to the Ottoman Empire, the remaining Abzakhs were relocated to the present-day steppe Shovgenovsky District in Adygea.

Culture
The Abzakh tribe was traditionally divided into nine companies, managed by elected elders. In discussing and resolving important issues elders agreed in a general meeting. The Abzakh tribe engaged in arable farming and horticulture, and kept many animals, especially prized horses. In the mountains, the Abzakh mined copper, iron, lead, and silver.

Since the early 19th century, their dominant religion is Sunni Islam.

Language

The Abzakh people speak a sub-dialect of the West Adyghe dialect of the Circassian language.

Israel
About 1,123 Abzakh people live in the Rehaniya, in Galilee (Northern District, Israel), where there is an Adyghe museum.

In 1958, Abzakhs (and other Adyghe tribes) of Israel were allowed to enter military service, which gave them a number of privileges. In Israel, the Abzakh are the second largest Adyghe tribe, after the Shapsug.

Notable people
Hulusi Salih Pasha (1885–1939); Ottoman Grand Vizier (1920), admiral, the first Minister of Navy of the Republic of Turkey

See also
Other Circassian tribes:
 Besleney
 Bzhedug
 Hatuqwai
 Kabardian
 Mamkhegh
 Natukhai
 Shapsug
 Temirgoy
 Ubykh
 Yegeruqwai
 Zhaney

References

Circassians
Circassian tribes
History of Kuban
Ethnic groups in Russia
Ethnic groups in Turkey
Adygea
Upper Galilee